Danila Alexeyevich Poperechny (born March 10, 1994) is a Russian stand-up comedian, YouTuber, actor and podcaster.

Early life 
Poperechny was born in Voronezh, Russia. When he was in high school, his family moved to Kyiv, Ukraine, where they have lived for six years. After graduating from school, Poperechny studied computer engineering in Rzeszów, Poland, but dropped out during his second year. When he was sixteen, he temporarily worked as a beta tester for GSC Game World, where he beta tested S.T.A.L.K.E.R.: Clear Sky.

Career 
Poperechny created his YouTube channel Spoontamer on December 11, 2009. The first videos he uploaded were self-made humorous cartoons. He also has worked for Spasibo, Eva! network as an animator, but soon left it because of its connection with Russian government. He started his stand up career in 2013 and has filmed seven specials for his YouTube channel. Poperechny names Louis C. K., Doug Stanhope, Jim Jefferies, and Joe Rogan among his inspirers. 

Poperechny is also known for his podcast Soulless (Bez dushi) where he speaks to Russian and foreign celebrities from different areas, such as Jacques Anthony, Gennady Khazanov, Irina Gorbacheva, L'One, Timur Batrutdinov, Daniel Sloss, Garic Kharlamov, Leonid Parfenov, Yolka, Ilya Naishuller, Ilya Prusikin, Morgenshtern, Yuri Kuklachov, Ekaterina Schulmann etc.

Poperecnhy also wrote scripts for Noize MC's music videos. As for 2021, he is cast in the leading role in Ilya Naishuller's Young Man (Molodoy chelovek).

Political activity 
Poperechny is famous for his active citizenship. He stands for the LGBT rights and opposes the Russian Orthodox Church. He has also repeatedly expressed support for Alexei Navalny and criticized current Russian government, especially Vladimir Putin, Dmitry Peskov, Ramzan Kadyrov, and Vitaly Milonov. The latter even sued him for filming a satirical music video POPE culture (POP-kul'tura), in which Poperechny had parodied stereotypical Russian Orthodox priest.

Two years later Poperechny published a parody on Ramzan Kadyrov. Chechen Press Minister Dzhambulat Umarov rated the video as an unprofessional performance and called Poperechny an idiotic donkey.

The Security Service of Ukraine banned Poperechny from entering Ukraine on May 15, 2018, for his anti-Ukrainian position, which caused the cancellation of his stand-up shows in Kyiv, Odessa, and Kharkiv. Later Poperechny claimed to challenge Ukrainian government in court.

In 2021, Poperechny paid a fine of $7.000 for Svetlana Prokopyeva, a journalist who had been charged with 'justifying terrorism'.

In February 2022, Poperechny opposed Russian invasion of Ukraine. Poperechny's video in which he condemns the Russian invasion was included in the list of prohibited materials by Roskomnadzor.

List of stand up specials 
 Stand Up in St Petersburg (Stand Up v Pitere), 2014
 Without Swearing (Bez mata), 2015
 The Big Lie (Bol'shaya lozh), 2015
 The D_CK (H_Y), 2016
 Where to Laugh? (Gde smeyatsya?), 2017
 The Unflattering (Nelitsepriyatny), 2018
 Speshl fo Kids, 2020

Notes

1994 births
Living people
People from Voronezh
Russian YouTubers
Russian podcasters
Russian comedy musicians
Russian screenwriters
Russian atheists
Critics of religions
Russian male comedians
Russian stand-up comedians
Comedy YouTubers
Russian activists against the 2022 Russian invasion of Ukraine
Russian video bloggers